List of Yugoslav World War II monuments and memorials in Croatia represent monuments and memorials built on the territory of the present day Croatia in Yugoslavia between 1945 and 1991. It does not include busts or other statues of individuals (see bottom).

History 
The Yugoslav authorities established several memorial sites between 1945 and 1960, though widespread building started after the founding of the Non-Aligned Movement.

Yugoslav president Josip Broz Tito commissioned several memorial sites and monuments in the 1960s and 70s dedicated to World War II battle, and concentration camp sites. They were designed by notable sculptors, including Dušan Džamonja, Vojin Bakić, Miodrag Živković, Jordan and Iskra Grabul, and architects, including Bogdan Bogdanović, Gradimir Medaković. After Tito's death, a small number was built, and the monuments were popular visitor attractions in the 1980s as patriotic sites.

After the dissolution of Yugoslavia and during the Yugoslav Wars in the 1990s, World War II monuments and memorials were targeted and destroyed by vandals while the new Croatian government did nothing to prevent them. It is thought that around 3000 antifascist memorials have been destroyed in Croatia since 1991 while some others were removed. Today, the remaining memorial sites are visited by mostly local antifascist organisations and World War II veterans. In recent times, some demolished monuments were rebuilt.

List

See also
People's Heroes of Yugoslavia monuments
List of World War II monuments and memorials in Bosnia and Herzegovina
List of World War II monuments and memorials in Montenegro
List of World War II monuments and memorials in North Macedonia
List of World War II monuments and memorials in Serbia
List of World War II monuments and memorials in Slovenia
List of Yugoslav World War II monuments and memorials

References 

World War II monuments and memorials
Croatia
World War II monuments and memorials